Sandstrand is a village in Tjeldsund Municipality in Troms og Finnmark county, Norway.  The village is located along the Vagsfjorden, just west of the minor village of Tovik, at the mouth of the Astafjorden.  It is located about midway between the small villages of Evenskjer and Grov.  The population (2001) of Sandstrand is 303.

The sports club IL Santor has its base in Sandstrand, though their football grounds is situated in nearby Renså.

Economy
The village boomed economically in the late 1970s and early 1980s. In the 1990s, however, most businesses had to close down due to competition from nearby cities and towns. Since being a thriving village, Sandstrand has arguably dwindled somewhat into rural passivity during recent years. Since then, many inhabitants commute to other areas where employment is easier to find.

References

Villages in Troms
Skånland